The Sangeet Natak Akademi Fellowship, also known as Akademi Ratna Sadasyata, is an Indian honour for the performing arts presented by Sangeet Natak Akademi. It is "the most prestigious and rare honour" conferred by the Akademi and is "restricted to 40 individuals at any given time".

Background
In 1945, The Asiatic Society of Bengal submitted a proposal to establish a National Cultural Trust consisting of three academies: an Academy of Music, Dance, and Drama, an Academy of Letters, and an Academy of Art and Architecture. The proposal was reconsidered in the Conference on Art held in Kolkata in 1949, and two conferences, the Conference on Letters, and the Conference on Dance, Drama, and Music, were held in New Delhi in 1951. All three conferences were organized by the Government of India and recommended the establishment of three national academies: an Academy of Music, Dance, and Drama (Sangeet Natak Akademi), an Academy of Letters (Sahitya Akademi), and an Academy of Art (Lalit Kala Akademi).

The Sangeet Natak Akademi, established on 31 May 1952 by a resolution of the Ministry of Human Resource Development (then the Ministry of Education), Government of India, headed by Maulana Abul Kalam Azad, is India's National Academy for Music, Dance, and Drama. The Akademi was officially inaugurated on 28 January 1953 by the first President of India, Rajendra Prasad and P. V. Rajamannar was appointed as its first Chairman. The first members of the Executive Board of the Akademi consisted of Maharaja Sri Sir Jayachamarajendra Wadiyar Bahadur, T. L. Venkatarama Aiyar, S. N. Mozumdar, N. R. Ray, Dharma Vira, A.K. Ghosh, J. C. Mathur, and A. V. Venkateswaran. Other two institutes were established later; the Sahitya Akademi was inaugurated on 12 March 1954 and the Lalit Kala Akademi was inaugurated on 5 August 1954. Later, on 11 September 1961, it was reorganized as a society and registered under the Societies Registration Act, 1860. Though the Sangeet Natak Akademi functions as an autonomous organization of the Ministry of Culture, its programmes are completely funded by the Government.

The Sangeet Natak Akademi is defined as "the apex body of the performing arts" in the country and primarily focuses on "preserving and promoting the vast intangible heritage of India's diverse culture expressed in the forms of music, dance and drama". The Akademi has also established various institutions in the fields of performing arts: the National School of Drama in New Delhi in 1959, the Jawaharlal Nehru Manipur Dance Academy in Imphal and the National Institute of Kathak Dance in New Delhi in 1964, and the Koodiyattam Kendra in Thiruvananthapuram in 1990. Since 1965, the Akademi also publishes a quarterly journal, Sangeet Natak.

Description
The Sangeet Natak Akademi Fellowship is conferred without distinction of nationality, race, caste, religion, creed, or sex. The criteria restricts any person below the age of 50 to ordinarily be considered for the honour, although a minimum age of 35 is required. Persons who are already deceased do not qualify; if an honoree dies before the honour is conferred, however, the honour will be assigned posthumously. The criteria also excludes any institution along with the members of the General Council of the Akademi from consideration. The fellowship does not refer to any specific work or achievement of an artist but to the "significant and lasting contribution on a sustained basis over a period of time". The recommendations are received from the current fellows along with the members of the General Council of the Akademi.

The fellowship was established in 1954 and the first elected fellows were Carnatic music vocalist Ariyakudi Ramanuja Iyengar, Veena player Karaikudi Sambasiva Aiyer, and film and theatre actor Prithviraj Kapoor. , the fellowship has been conferred upon 148 individuals, including 32 dancers, 31 theater performers, 76 musicians, and 9 individuals awarded for their overall contributions in all three fields. Since its inception, the honour has been bestowed upon 26 female artists and, in 1958, a Hindustani classical vocalist, belonging to the Bhendibazaar gharana, Anjanibai Malpekar became the first woman fellow of the Akademi. A French national and musicologist Alain Daniélou is the only non-Indian national awarded with the fellowship.

As per the constitutional provision under Rule 12 (vi) of the Rules and Regulations of the Akademi, the number of fellows is restricted to 30. On 25 March 2003, the General Council of the Akademi recommended restricting the number of fellows to 40 living persons and a total of 60 at any given time. However, the recommendation is not yet approved by the Ministry. , there are 39 Fellows of the Sangeet Natak Akademi. The most recent fellowship was announced on 25 November 2022 and awarded to ten recipients for the year 2019, 2020 and 2021.

List of fellows

See also
List of Sahitya Akademi fellows
List of Lalit Kala Akademi fellows

Explanatory notes

References

External links

 

Civil awards and decorations of India
Recipients of the Sangeet Natak Akademi Fellowship
Indian art awards
Fellowships
Sangeet Natak Akademi
Lists of members of learned societies
Awards established in 1954